There are at least 34,000 Britons in Turkey. They consist mainly of British citizens married to Turkish spouses, British Turks who have moved back into the country, students and families of long-term expatriates employed predominantly in white-collar industry. There are also a few English retirees and pensioners who choose to live in the country after retirement, currently numbering up to 1,000. Many British firms are active in Turkey; consequently, many British employees working in Turkey are originally stationed by companies and multinational corporations back home, and can be seen serving in capacities such as general managers, marketing consultants and financial directors. They tend to be involved in sales, marketing, technical and human resources departments.

The majority of Britons are found in Istanbul and Izmir, with smaller populations scattered throughout the capital Ankara. Istanbul is generally seen as a favourite location due to the city being the country's commercial capital, the presence of international schools and better air links with the UK. British residents living in smaller urban centres are mainly occupied in the textile and energy sectors.

Turkey remains one of the top tourist and investment destinations for British nationals. The towns of Çeşme, Didim, Fethiye, Marmaris, Bodrum and Antalya are hot spots for Britons in Turkey. According to statistics, a record 32,000 Britons own property in Turkey, surpassing all other foreign property buyers. The properties range from holiday residences to private beaches centred on popular resorts.

Social and business life
Many community and business organisations are active. One business organisation is the British Chamber of Commerce, which supports British businesses in Turkey.

In 2008, a poll was conducted among retired British expats in Turkey, with the question being whether they would approve of Turkey's accession to the European Union. The results showed a great number replying in the negative, citing concerns that doing so may cause Turkey to lose its identity and culture. The poll showed that many Britons are attracted to Turkey because of its not being as Europeanized, as well as its favourable climate, cheaper standards of living, the social circles and less pressure in daily life.

References

Turkey
European diaspora in Turkey
Immigration to Turkey
Turkey–United Kingdom relations